Lake of Two Mountains (French: Lac des Deux Montagnes) is part of the river delta widening of the Ottawa River in Quebec, Canada, at its confluence with the St. Lawrence River.

Lake of Two Mountains has four outflows: Rivière des Mille Îles and Rivière des Prairies, bordering Île Jésus, and two branches of the Ottawa River, flowing into the St. Lawrence via Lake Saint-Louis, on either side of Île Perrot.

The city of Deux-Montagnes is located on the lake's north shore, where it flows into Rivière des Mille Îles. The southwest portion of the city of Montreal borders the eastern part of the lake, as does the now merged village of Senneville. Kanesatake (Kanehsatà:ke), a Kanien'kéha:ka Mohawk reserve in Kanesatake, Quebec, is also located along the northern shore.

Origin of the name
The lake was named lac des Médicis in 1612 by French explorer Samuel de Champlain, then renamed lac des Soissons about 1632. By around 1684 French colonists named it as Lac des Deux Montagnes. The name refers to Calvaire Mountain and Saint-Joseph-du-Lac Hill, the two highest peaks of Mont Oka that face the lake on its northern shore.

See also 
List of crossings of the Ottawa River

Lakes of Laurentides
Lakes of Montérégie
Landforms of Montreal